Marine Corps Air Station Camp Pendleton or MCAS Camp Pendleton  is a United States Marine Corps airfield located within Marine Corps Base Camp Pendleton, California. It was commissioned in 1942 and is currently home to Marine Aircraft Group 39.  The airfield is also known as Munn Field in honor of Lieutenant General John C. "Toby" Munn, the first Marine aviator to serve as the Commanding General of Marine Corps Base Camp Pendleton.

History

On September 25, 1942, the area presently known as Marine Corps Air Station, Camp Pendleton, California was designated an auxiliary landing field and served as a sub-unit of Marine Corps Air Station El Toro. The airfield was 6,000 ft by 400 ft and began operating in November 1942.  In February 1944, it became an Outlying Field (OLF) to Marine Corps Auxiliary Field Gillespie and it was during this time that the first squadrons were actually assigned to the field.  Among the first squadrons were VMO-5, VMF-323 and VMF-471.  In September 1944, the field was designated as a permanent establishment.  In 1945, due to overcrowding at Marine Corps Air Station El Centro, Marine Aircraft Group 35 began parking its spare transport planes at the field as well.

During the early 1950s, the airfield was used in filming The Flying Leathernecks starring John Wayne.

Marine Observation Squadron FIVE (VMO-5), a composite squadron consisting of both OV-10 Bronco fixed-wing aircraft and UH-1 Huey helicopters, was established in 1966 and was the first squadron stationed at the airfield following World War II.

Through the years, aviation began to play an increasing role in Marine Corps tactics, creating a need for modern facilities. To meet this need, the auxiliary landing field was re-designated a Marine Corps Air Facility (MCAF) on September 1, 1978 serving as home to Marine Aircraft Group 39 (MAG-39). Since 1978, the Group expanded to a strength of four tactical helicopter squadrons, one helicopter training squadron, one observation squadron, and an aviation logistics squadron. This increase in aircraft and personnel established once again the need for improved facilities.

On March 13, 1985, MCAF Pendleton was re-designated as Marine Corps Air Station effective April 1, 1985.  Today, the Air Station supports over 180 helicopters assigned to MAG-39, Marine Aircraft Group 46 Detachment A, and a wide variety of other Marine Corps units and visiting aircraft from other branches of the Armed Forces. The closure of MCAS Tustin and MCAS El Toro were a result of Base Realignment and Closure legislation which saw MCAS Camp Pendleton expand its facilities again to support three additional helicopter squadrons. The first medium lift helicopter squadron joined MAG-39 in January 1999, and the final one came in June of that year.

In July 2020, the station's Headquarters and Headquarters Squadron became a flying unit for the first time when it received a UC-12W Huron. The aircraft is used in the operational support role, allowing high priority passengers and cargo to be flown at a reduced cost compared to using the MV-22B Osprey or UH-1Y Venom.

Based units 
Flying and notable non-flying units based at MCAS Camp Pendleton.

United States Marine Corps 
Marine Corps Installations – West

 Headquarters and Headquarters Squadron – UC-12W Huron

3rd Marine Aircraft Wing

 Marine Aircraft Group 39
 Headquarters Squadron 39 (MAG-39 HQ)
 Marine Aviation Logistics Squadron 39 (MALS-39)
 Marine Light Attack Helicopter Squadron 169 (HMLA-169) – AH-1Z Viper and UH-1Y Venom
 Marine Light Attack Helicopter Squadron 267 (HMLA-267) – AH-1Z Viper and UH-1Y Venom
 Marine Light Attack Helicopter Training Squadron 303 (HMLAT-303) – AH-1Z Viper and UH-1Y Venom
 Marine Light Attack Helicopter Training Squadron 303 (HMLAT-303) Squadron Augment Unit – AH-1Z Viper and UH-1Y Venom
 Marine Light Attack Helicopter Squadron 369 (HMLA-369) – AH-1Z Viper and UH-1Y Venom
 Marine Light Attack Helicopter Squadron 469 (HMLA-469) – AH-1Z Viper and UH-1Y Venom
 Marine Light Attack Helicopter Squadron 775 (HMLA-775) – AH-1W Super Cobra, AH-1Z Viper and UH-1Y Venom
 Marine Medium Tilt-rotor Squadron 164 (VMM-164) – MV-22B Osprey
 Marine Medium Tilt-rotor Squadron 364 (VMM-364) – MV-22B Osprey
 Marine Aircraft Group 41
 Marine Unmanned Aerial Vehicle Squadron 4 (VMU-4) – RQ-21 Blackjack

See also

 List of airports in California
 List of United States Marine Corps installations
 United States Marine Corps Aviation

References
Notes

Bibliography

Web
 MCAS Camp Pendleton's official website

External links
MCAS Camp Pendleton's official website
Marine Corps Community Services at Camp Pendleton
Camp Pendleton at GlobalSecurity.org
USMC Air Station Camp Pendleton Overview & PCS Information (MarineCorpsUSA.org)

Military installations established in 1942
Airports in San Diego County, California
active
World War II airfields in the United States
Military facilities in San Diego County, California
1942 establishments in California